Mathurin Moreau (18 November 1822 – 14 February 1912) was a French sculptor in the academic style.

Moreau was born in Dijon, first exhibited in the 1848 Salon, and finally received a medal of honor from the Salon in 1897. He was made mayor of the 19th arrondissement of Paris, and in 1912 had a street named in his honor. His father was the sculptor  and his siblings included sculptors Hippolyte and Auguste Moreau.

Selected works 
 La Fileuse, marble, Palais du Luxembourg
 Victoria Park Fountain, Ashford Kent, originally 1862.
 Cologne, limestone, 1865, façade de la gare du Nord
 L'Océanie, from the Exposition Universelle (1878), Musée d'Orsay courtyard
 Zenobe Gramme, bronze, Musée des Arts et Métiers courtyard, Paris
 Monument de Joigneaux, for which he received the medal of honor, Salon of 1897
 Tomb of Zenobe Gramme, Père Lachaise Cemetery, Paris, circa 1901
 Lord Strathcona Fountain, Ottawa, Ontario, Canada, unveiled 1 July 1909
 Fountain of the Continents (The original name was La Fontaine de L'Observatoire), Mendoza (Argentina), 1910.
 Négresse and Égyptienne - mass-produced neoclassical style beaux-arts statues depicting female ancient Egyptian and ancient Kushite royal figures holding aloft a torch. Usually cast in iron. Notable examples can be seen outside the Shelbourne Hotel in Dublin, at the mausoleum of the American architect Temple Hoyne Buell and in the Jardins do Palácio de Cristal in Porto.

References 

 Insecula entry 
 Article after le Grand dictionnaire Larousse du XIXe siècle, Tomes 12 and 13, articles and supplements 1875-1890.

External links

 

1822 births
1912 deaths
Artists from Dijon
Prix de Rome for sculpture
École des Beaux-Arts alumni
20th-century French sculptors
19th-century French sculptors
French male sculptors
19th-century French male artists